Kenneth Stopford Avery (24 June 1922 – 12 June 1983) was a New Zealand jazz musician, radio programme manager and songwriter. He was born on 24 June 1922.

References

1922 births
1983 deaths
New Zealand musicians
New Zealand songwriters